Yanaorjo (possibly from Quechua yana black, urqu mountain, "black mountain") is a mountain in the Urubamba mountain range in the Andes of  Peru, about  high. It lies in the Cusco Region, Calca Province, Calca District. Yanaorjo is situated southeast of Sahuasiray, south of Ccerayoc, north of Ajosune or Aqosune and Apurinru, and northwest of Pumacallanca and Llamayojcasa.

The two small lakes northeast of Yanaorjo are named Ancascocha (possibly from Quechua for "blue lake") and Suirococha (possibly from Quechua for suyru a very long dress tracked after when worn, qucha lake).

References 

Mountains of Peru
Mountains of Cusco Region